Ferrugem means "rust" in Portuguese. It is also a common nickname and may refer to:

Ferrugem (footballer, born 1988), a Brazilian right-back and midfielder footballer
Ferrugem (footballer, born 1992), a Brazilian right-back footballer
Rodrigo (footballer, born October 1980), a Brazilian former midfielder footballer, also nicknamed Ferrugem

Other uses 
Rust (2018 film), a 2018 Brazilian film, originally titled Ferrugem